The Raise 'Em Up Tour was the ninth headlining tour by Australian country music singer Keith Urban, in support of his eighth studio album Fuse (2013). The tour began on 12 July 2014 in Calgary, Canada and ended on 7 September 2014 in Wheatland, California. This tour started two weeks after he completed the Light the Fuse Tour.

Concert synopsis
During the show Urban goes out and performs on a small stage. While performing on the small stage in Calgary, Urban invited country singer Lindsay Ell to sing Miranda Lambert's part in "We Were Us".

Opening acts
Jerrod Niemann
Brett Eldredge

Setlist

"Love's Poster Child"
"Sweet Thing"
"Somewhere in My Car"
"Only You Can Love Me This Way"
"Long Hot Summer"
"Even the Stars Fall 4 U"
"Shame"
"Kiss a Girl"
"Who Wouldn't Wanna Be Me"
"Used to the Pain"
"Stupid Boy"
"Come Back to Me"
"Little Bit of Everything"
"Days Go By"
"Put You in a Song"
"You Look Good in My Shirt"
"Cop Car"
"Once in a Lifetime"
"You Gonna Fly"
Encore
"Making Memories of Us"
"Raining on Sunday"
"Good Thing"
"Better Life" 
"Somebody Like You"

Tour dates

Festivals
 This concert is a part of the Calgary Stampede.
 This concert is a part of the Craven Country Jamboree.
 This concert is a part of the Jamboree in the Hills.
 This concert is a part of the Faster Horses Festival.
 This concert is a part of the Delaware State Fair.

Critical reception
Eric Volmez of the Calgary Herald says, "Urban's fiery return to the Saddledome for a Stampede concert Saturday was his second stop this year to promote 2013's Fuse and further proof that he has easily mastered into one of the genre's most reliable exciting concert draws over the past decade, heads and shoulders above most of his cowboy hat/baseball cap-wearing brethren that dominate the charts."

References

External links

2014 concert tours
Keith Urban concert tours